Amauris vashti is a butterfly of the family Nymphalidae.

Description
The uppersides of the forewings are black, with two large basal whitish spots and a few small spots on the edge. The uppersides of the hindwings are dark brown in  males, pale brown in females.

Distribution
This species can be found in tropical Africa, mainly in Nigeria, Cameroun, Central African Republic and Democratic Republic of the Congo.

References
 "Amauris Hübner, 1816" at Markku Savela's Lepidoptera and Some Other Life Forms
 Biolib

External links
World Field Guide
Seitz, A. Die Gross-Schmetterlinge der Erde 13: Die Afrikanischen Tagfalter. Plate XIII 23 d

Amauris
Butterflies described in 1869
Butterflies of Africa
Taxa named by Arthur Gardiner Butler